Halay is the national dance of Turkey and a regional category of folk dance styles in central, southern, eastern, and southeastern regions of the country. It is mainly performed by Turks, Arabs, and Kurds in Turkey. Halay and similar dances are parts of multiple ancient folk dance traditions and cultures throughout the Middle East and regions in proximity.

These dances are mostly found in weddings and generally accompanied by zurna and davul, but in the recent years, electronic instruments have started to replace them. Typically, Halay dancers form a circle or a line, while holding each other in many ways, such as finger to finger, shoulder to shoulder, or hand to hand. The last and the first player may hold a piece of cloth. It usually begins slow and speeds up.

Due to the restrictions concerning COVID-19 pandemic in Turkey Halay dance had been restricted in weddings. Because of the pandemic weddings were required people to hold sticks connecting each other, rather than their hands.

Etymology 
The linguistic origin of the term Halay is not fully known. There are multiple theories. The original etymology given in the Kubbealtı Dictionary is that the word is derived from the word "alay", which means "community, crowd". The word "alay" was transferred to Turkish from Persian. In Persian, it is taken from the Greek  aláyi(on) αλάγιον "independent cavalry unit in the Byzantine army (10th century)". The Greek word(aláyi) is taken from the Latin "alae". This word(alae) is the plural of the Latin "ala" 1st wing, 2nd the name given to the cavalry units in the Roman army. The Latin word was recorded at the 2nd century BC and refers to the cavalry units deployed to the right and left of the infantry unit in the centre. The Greek form first appears in the 959 compilation of laws by Constantine VIII Porphyrogennetos. The original meaning of the Turkish word is a cavalry unit in neat ranks, unlike the traditional Turkish raiding order.

Examples of halay
Elazığ dik halay (danced by Turks and Kurds)
Akdağmadeni halay (danced by Turks and Greeks)
Tamzara (danced by Armenians and Turks)
Kochari (danced by Armenians, Kurds, and Turks)
Üç Ayak  (danced by Turks)
Kaba (danced by Turks)
Afshar (danced by Turks)
Halabi (danced by Turks, Kurds, and Arabs)
Dunnik (danced by Kurds)

See also
Dîlan (danced by Kurds)
Assyrian folk dance
Dabke (danced by Lebanese and Syrian peoples)
Attan (danced by Afghans)
Harkuşta (danced by Armenians)
Horon (danced by Pontic Greek, Laz, and Turkish peoples)
Faroese dance
Kolo (danced by Southern Slavs)
Ohuokhai

References

Circle dances
Middle Eastern dances
Turkish dances
Armenian dances
Dance
Azerbaijani dances
Greek dances
Iranian dances
Kurdish dance